Owen Hills is an area of rugged ice-covered hills on the west side of Beardmore Glacier, between Socks and Evans Glaciers, in the Queen Alexandra Range. Named by Advisory Committee on Antarctic Names (US-ACAN) for George Owen, Special Assistant for Antarctica in the Dept. of State, 1959–62.

Hills of the Ross Dependency
Shackleton Coast